Aston Park is a public park located in downtown Dallas, Texas, United States. The park is located on a triangle of land located between Pacific, Harwood and Live Oak in the City Center District.

History

The park was dedicated in 1983 in honor of James W. Aston, who was a prominent business leader and president of Republic National Bank in 1957.

Adjacent to Republic Center, Corrigan Tower and Pacific Place, the park consists of a grove of mature trees and plaza area. As currently designed it receives little use because of its isolation from downtown activity centers. Future plans will incorporate Aston Park into the larger Pacific Plaza Park across Live Oak.

References

External links 
Dallas Parks Master Plan

Buildings and structures in Dallas
Parks in Dallas